The 2015 Melon Music Awards were held on Saturday, November 7, 2015, at the Olympic Gymnastics Arena in Seoul, South Korea. Organized by Kakao M through its online music store Melon, the 2015 ceremony was the seventh installment of the event. The ceremony was hosted by television personality Yoo Byung-jae. Exo and Big Bang led the number of nominations with five each, with BigBang winning four of those awards while Exo won two.

Performers

Presenters 
MCs
 Yoo Byung-jae
 Seo Kang-joon
 Lee Yu-bi
 Kim Shin-young
 Kim So-hyun
 Irene

Winners and nominees

Main awards 
Winners and nominees are listed below. Winners are listed first and emphasized in bold.

Other awards

References

External links 

 Official website

2015 music awards
Melon Music Awards ceremonies
Annual events in South Korea